Cynthia Cameron (born 26 March 1980) is an Australian taekwondo practitioner, born in Perth. She competed at the 2000 Summer Olympics in Sydney.

References

External links

1980 births
Living people
Sportspeople from Perth, Western Australia
Sportswomen from Western Australia
Australian female taekwondo practitioners
Olympic taekwondo practitioners of Australia
Taekwondo practitioners at the 2000 Summer Olympics